Steve Hansley Malcouzanne (born 21 June 1982) is a Seychellois badminton player. He competed at the 2006, 2010, 2014, and 2018 Commonwealth Games. He was the Seychelles flag bearer during the 2010 Commonwealth Games opening ceremony in New Delhi, India. He was named 2009 Sportsman of the Year at the Seychelles Sports Awards.

Achievements

All-Africa Games 
Men's doubles

African Championships 
Men's singles

Men's doubles

BWF International Challenge/Series
Men's doubles

Mixed doubles

 BWF International Challenge tournament
 BWF International Series tournament
 BWF Future Series tournament

References

External links
 

1982 births
Living people
People from Greater Victoria, Seychelles
Seychellois male badminton players
Badminton players at the 2006 Commonwealth Games
Badminton players at the 2010 Commonwealth Games
Badminton players at the 2014 Commonwealth Games
Badminton players at the 2018 Commonwealth Games
Commonwealth Games competitors for Seychelles
Competitors at the 2003 All-Africa Games
Competitors at the 2007 All-Africa Games
Competitors at the 2011 All-Africa Games
Competitors at the 2015 African Games
African Games bronze medalists for Seychelles
African Games medalists in badminton